Movistar–Best PC is an Ecuadorian cycling team established in 2019. In its first season at UCI Continental level in 2020, the team took two stage victories at the Vuelta a Guatemala, and three stage victories at the Vuelta al Ecuador.

Team roster

Major wins
2020
Stages 6 & 8 Vuelta a Guatemala, Harold Martín López
Stages 2, 3 & 5 Vuelta al Ecuador, Byron Guamá

2021
Stage 6 Vuelta al Tachira, Anderson Timoteo Paredes
Stage 3 Vuelta al Ecuador, Sebastián Novoa
Stage 4 Vuelta al Ecuador, Santiago Montenegro

References

External links

UCI Continental Teams (America)
Cycling teams based in Ecuador
Cycling teams established in 2019